The Concerto for Orchestra is an orchestral composition by the Finnish composer Magnus Lindberg.  The work was commissioned by the BBC and was composed between 2002 and 2003.  It was given its world premiere by the BBC Symphony Orchestra under the direction of Jukka-Pekka Saraste on September 30, 2003 at the Barbican Centre, London.

Composition
The Concerto for Orchestra has a duration of roughly 28 minutes and is composed in five numbered movements played without pause.

Instrumentation
The work is scored for a large orchestra comprising three flutes (3rd doubling alto flute and piccolo), three oboes (3rd doubling cor anglais), four clarinets (3rd doubling E-flat clarinet; 4th doubling bass clarinet), three bassoons (3rd doubling contrabassoon), four horns, four trumpets (4th doubling trumpet in D), three trombones, tuba, timpani, three percussionists, piano (doubling celesta), harp, and strings.

Reception
The Concerto for Orchestra has been praised by music critics.  Steven Pritchard of The Guardian compared the work favorably to Lindberg's Campana In Aria, saying the "Concerto for Orchestra is altogether more commanding."  Annette Morreau of The Independent wrote, "In recent years, Lindberg has written a series of purely orchestral pieces and a series of concertos; this work is a triumphant combination of the two with real concertante demands on all sections of the orchestra and the occasional big solo for individual members."  She added, "Lindberg, in his mid-forties, has come of age: this is a piece on another level with extraordinary confidence, boldness of gesture and an architectural logic that makes it at once familiar. Lindberg's harmonic language is now so rich and varied, consonance, if anything, more evident than dissonance."  The music was similarly praised by Steven Pritchard of The Observer and Joshua Kosman of the San Francisco Chronicle, who called the piece "a grandiose canvas".  Andrew Clements of The Guardian compared the work to Lindberg's Sculpture, observing:

Conversely, Richard Whitehouse of Gramophone was more critical of the work, remarking:

Recording
A recording of the Concerto for Orchestra, performed by the Finnish Radio Symphony Orchestra under the direction of Sakari Oramo, was released through Ondine on January 1, 2008.  The album also features Lindberg's Sculpture and Campana in Aria.

References

Concertos by Magnus Lindberg
2003 compositions
Lindberg
Music commissioned by the BBC